The Kindness Diaries is a documentary television series on Netflix and Discovery+. The series stars former broker Leon Logothetis and debuted in 2017. In a Facebook Live, Leon announced the show would be renewed for a third season. In the series, Logothetis travels around the world relying only on the kindness of strangers for food, shelter, and gas. In the first season, he uses a vintage Chang Jiang motorcycle and sidecar he calls Kindness 1, after The Motorcycle Diaries, which served as an inspiration for his journey. In season 2, he uses a vintage Volkswagen Beetle convertible, which he names Kindness 2. His journey in season 2 moves from Alaska to Argentina.
The series also airs on BYUtv. As of June 2021, the series began streaming on Discovery+.

Premise
Logothetis travels around the world relying on the kindness of strangers for food, shelter, gas, etc. He cannot accept money. He also listens to their stories while visiting. In exchange for their kindness, he helps them realise their dreams to pay it forward.

References

External links
 
 

2017 American television series debuts
2017 American television series endings
2010s American documentary television series
Netflix original documentary television series
English-language Netflix original programming